Still Cyco After All These Years is the seventh studio album by American crossover thrash band Suicidal Tendencies, released in 1993. The album is composed of re-recorded songs from the band's 1983 debut album, Suicidal Tendencies; re-recordings of "War Inside My Head" and "A Little Each Day" from the band's second album, Join the Army; and "Don't Give Me Your Nothin'" which was previously released as a B-side to "Send Me Your Money".

Album information 
The album was recorded in 1989–1990 during the Lights...Camera...Revolution! sessions. It contained the songs from the band's 1983 self-titled debut album. Frontman Mike Muir was upset with Frontier Records, the independent label that released Suicidal Tendencies' debut album, over various royalty and publishing issues. Since Muir did not have the rights to reissue the debut, he instead re-recorded the songs for release through Epic Records.

Singles for Still Cyco After All These Years were released for "Institutionalized" and "I Saw Your Mommy". Music videos were made for "Institutionalized" and "War Inside My Head" (previously available on the 1990 VHS Lights...Camera...Suicidal).

Track listing 
All songs by Mike Muir unless otherwise noted.

Song origins 
 Original versions of tracks 1–6, 9–12, and 14–15 were on the album Suicidal Tendencies (1983)
 Original versions of tracks 7 and 13 were on the album Join the Army (1987)
 Track 8 was previously released as a B-side to the single "Send Me Your Money" from Lights...Camera...Revolution! (1990)

Credits 
 Mike Muir – lead vocals
 Rocky George – lead guitar
 Mike Clark – rhythm guitar
 Robert Trujillo – bass
 R. J. Herrera – drums (was present for the album's recording but left the band by the time of its release)
 Recorded at Rumbo Studios, vocals recorded at Titan Studio
 Produced by Mark Dodson and Mike Muir
 Engineered by Mike Dodson
 Mixed at A&M Studios

Chart positions

Album 
Billboard (North America)

References

External links 
Suicidal Tendencies official website

Suicidal Tendencies albums
1993 compilation albums
Albums produced by Mark Dodson
Epic Records albums